The bidding process for the 2019 FIBA Basketball World Cup was the procedure for the International Basketball Federation (FIBA) in choosing the hosts for the 2019 FIBA World Cup. The process was concluded on 7 August 2015 with China announced by the basketball world body as hosts of the 2019 FIBA World Cup. The other candidate country was the Philippines.

All FIBA national federations are allowed to bid for the 2019 Basketball World Cup, but FIBA also added that a federation can bid on both the 2019 and 2023 World Cups or bid only for 2023 and award hosts for events at the same time.

Bidding calendar 
On 16 April 2014, in a press release, FIBA announced the bidding calendar for the 2019 and/or 2023 Basketball World Cup.
 Expression of interest phase
 April 2014 – Request for Expression of Interest issued to National Federations
 9 June 2014 – Deadline for return of the Expression of Interest to FIBA
 Applicant phase
 August 2014 – Deadline for the Observer Programme at the 2014 FIBA Basketball World Cup
 September 2014 – Observer Programme on the 2014 FIBA Basketball World Cup in Spain
 October 2014 – Deadline for submission of the bid application questionnaire
 Candidate phase
 November 2014 – Announcement of the candidate nations by FIBA
 December 2014 – Workshop for Candidates at Geneva, Switzerland
 January–February 2015 – On-site inspection visits
 April 2015 – Deadline of the submission of final candidature files
 7 August 2015 – Final bid presentations and announcement of the host nation by the FIBA Central Board in Tokyo.

Candidate countries 
On 16 March 2015, FIBA announced that its executive committee has decided that the 2019 World Cup would be held in Asia, putting the bids of China and the Philippines as the final candidates in the running as hosts.

Bids from Germany, Turkey and Qatar were moved for the 2023 FIBA Basketball World Cup. Those from France, Lithuania, Russia, Venezuela, and Mexico were disregarded.

Selection
After the final bid presentation conducted by the two candidate countries in Tokyo, Japan on 7 August 2015. The FIBA Central Board decided on the hosts of the 2019 tournament and announced China as hosts of the tournament on the same day. 14 voted for China while 7 voted for the Philippines for the right to host the tournament.

References

External links
 
 

Bids
FIBA World Cup bids
FIBA World Cup bids
FIBA Basketball World Cup bids